Edmund Winston Sr. (b. 1745 – d. August 18, 1818) was a lawyer, politician, jurist, and patriot of the American Revolution for Virginia.

Biography 
Winston was born in 1745 in Hanover County, Virginia, the son of Lt. William Winston and Sarah Dabney. He became a lawyer in 1767 and supported the American Revolution, furnishing supplies in support of the cause of independence. 

By 1781, he had earned enough prominence for Thomas Jefferson to record in his book, Notes on the State of Virginia, that lead from western Virginia was loaded on the boats at "Lynch's ferry, or Winston's, on [the] James River." He was elected to represent Bedford, Campbell, Henry, and Pittsylvania Counties in the Senate of Virginia from 1776 to 1783.   

Winston served as prosecuting attorney in Campbell County during 1787-88. He was also a representative to the Virginia Ratifying Convention of 1788, which ratified the U. S. Constitution.  

In 1788, Winston was elected by the Virginia General Assembly to the General Court of Virginia, which heard appeals from the county courts, and served in the role until 1813. During his first two weeks on the bench, from December 11 to December 24 of 1788, he was also an ex officio member of the Supreme Court of Virginia until it became a separate body with five judges.   

Winston was a friend of Thomas Jefferson, and, according to the Jefferson Papers, visited him at Monticello on multiple occasions.

Family and Children 
In October 1771, he married Alice Taylor Winston, a daughter of his uncle, Judge Anthony Winston, of Buckingham County. They had six children, George Dabney, Sarah, Alice, Mary, Edmund Jr., and Elizabeth. Alice died in 1784, leaving him with six children ages 1-10. Their daughter Sarah married George Cabell, prominent surgeon and builder of Point of Honor. 

Winston was a first cousin and long-time friend of Governor Patrick Henry, who appointed him as an executor of his will. After Henry's death in 1799, Winston was active in the settlement of the Red Hill estate and various tracts of land. This process involved frequent communication with Henry’s widow, Dorothea Dandridge Henry.  

In June 1802, he married Dorothea in Charlotte County. He had no additional children with Dorothea, but helped support her children from Patrick and his children from his first wife. In total, they had 21 children in their blended family; many of whom were adults at the time of their marriage. They lived at the Huntingtour Estate in Nelson County.

Death 
Winston died on August 18, 1818, in Lynchburg, Virginia.

See also 

 List of justices of the Supreme Court of Virginia

References 

1745 births
1818 deaths
18th-century American politicians
Justices of the Supreme Court of Virginia
Members of the Virginia General Assembly
Patriots in the American Revolution
People from Hanover County, Virginia
Virginia colonial people